Durham Centre was a provincial electoral district in the Durham Region. Created in 1987, the riding contained the town of Whitby from south of Taunton Road. It was abolished in 1999 and redistributed into Whitby—Ajax.

Member history

Election results

Former provincial electoral districts of Ontario